Alewa is a town in Jind district, Haryana state, India, with a population of nearly 14,000. The village is the location of many temples. It is also a tehsil of Jind district. It lies on the Jind to Karnal-Kurukshetra highway.

Demographics
Alewa is sited north east of Jind and has Pillukhera tehsil to its north.

Villages in the tehsil
Alewa
Khanda
Gohiyan
Dhillowal
Mandi Khurd
Hassanpur 
Nagura
Katwal
Bighana
Mohmad Khera
 Dhathrath
Raichandwala
pegan
Durana
Shamdo
Chuhadpur
Kheri Bulanwali

Transportation
There is a bus service every 10 minutes for jind And Assandh.

The nearest railway stations are Jind Junction and Safidon.

See also
Rohtak

References 

Cities and towns in Jind district